Cockington Green Gardens is a park of miniatures, situated in Nicholls, Australian Capital Territory. Doug and Brenda Sarah had the idea to create a miniature village in 1972, and Cockington Green was opened on 3 November 1979.

The business is family owned and operated, incorporating over four generations.

Gallery

References

External links 
 

Miniature parks
Tourist attractions in Canberra
Parks in Canberra